Konstantinogradovka is a rural locality (a village) and the administrative centre of Konstantinogradovsky Selsoviet, Sterlitamaksky District, Bashkortostan, Russia. The population was 515 as of 2010. There are 4 streets.

Geography 
Konstantinogradovka is located 47 km northwest of Sterlitamak (the district's administrative centre) by road. Bogolyubovka is the nearest rural locality.

References 

Rural localities in Sterlitamaksky District